Topo-Chico is a brand of sparkling mineral water from Mexico. Topo-Chico is both naturally carbonated at the source and artificially carbonated.

History
Topo-Chico has been sourced from and bottled in Monterrey, Mexico since 1895. The drink takes its name from the mountain Cerro del Topo Chico, near Monterrey.

In 2017, The Coca-Cola Company purchased Topo-Chico for $220 million. The brand was originally popular in northern Mexico and Texas, with the Coca-Cola Company later helping popularize it across the United States. The drink has a cult following.

Ranch Water is a cocktail made with tequila, lime juice and Topo-Chico, over ice, a popular drink in Texas.

Topo-Chico Hard Seltzer
In 2021, the Coca-Cola Co used its sparkling mineral water brand Topo-Chico to launch a range of vegan friendly alcoholic hard seltzers in the United Kingdom and in the United States with Molson Coors. The range includes Tangy Lemon Lime, Tropical Mango and Cherry Acai flavors in the United Kingdom and flavors such as Tangy Lemon Lime, Tropical Mango, Strawberry Guava and Exotic Pineapple in the US.

In early 2022, Topo Chico Hard Seltzer launched their new Hard Seltzer Topo Chico Ranch Water in select markets, along with the national rollout of its popular variety pack. The product features real lime juice and a refreshing, crisp taste. The product is now available in stores across Alabama, Arizona, California, Colorado, Georgia, New Mexico, Oklahoma, Tennessee, and Texas.

In Popular Culture
"Topo Chico" is the subject and title of the last song on Robert Ellis's 2019 album Texas Piano Man.

Topo Chico is featured on the album cover of  Seattle WA band iji’s 2013 album UNLD. COOL DRINKS.

See also

 List of bottled water brands
 List of Coca-Cola brands

References

Further reading

External links 
 Topo Chico Water Analysis Report

Mineral water
Coca-Cola brands
Monterrey
Mexican brands